The Jizera Formation is a geologic unit of Late Cretaceous (Turonian) age, located in the Czech Republic. It is a unit of the Bohemian Cretaceous Basin.<ref name=Zoltan2015>Zoltan Csiki-Sava, Eric Buffetaut, Attila Ősi, Xabier Pereda-Suberbiola, Stephen L. Brusatte (2015) "Island life in the Cretaceous - faunal composition, biogeography, evolution, and extinction of land-living vertebrates on the Late Cretaceous European archipelago" Zookeys" 469: 1-161 doi: 10.3897/zookeys.469.8439</ref>  It consists of fluvial to shallow marine sediments and pterosaur fossils are among the remains found in the Jizera Formation. The type locality of the Jizera Formation is a quarry in Zářecká Lhota.A. Fritsch. (1881). Über die Entdeckung von Vogelresten in der böhm. Kreideformation. Sitzungsberichte der Königlichen Böhmischen Gesellschaft der Wissenschaften 1880:275-276

PaleofaunaCretornis hlavaci'' - "a complete humerus (upper arm bone), an ulna, radius, wrist and two phalanges of the wing finger"

See also
 List of fossiliferous stratigraphic units in Europe

References 

Geologic formations of the Czech Republic
Upper Cretaceous Series of Europe
Santonian Stage
Sandstone formations
Fluvial deposits
Fossiliferous stratigraphic units of Europe
Paleontology in the Czech Republic